Asturian miners' strike may refer to:
 Asturian miners' strike of 1934
 2012 Asturian miners' strike